Rufus is an American funk band from Chicago, Illinois, best known for launching the career of lead singer Chaka Khan. They had several hits throughout their career, including "Tell Me Something Good", "Sweet Thing", "Do You Love What You Feel" and "Ain't Nobody". Rufus and Chaka Khan were one of the most popular and influential funk bands of the 1970s, with four consecutive number one R&B albums, ten top 40 pop hits and five number one R&B singles, among other accolades.

Biography

Origins
In 1968, the American Breed (Gary Loizzo, guitar/vocals; Al Ciner, guitar; Charles "Chuck" Colbert, bass; and Lee Graziano, drums) had a top ten hit with the classic rock single, "Bend Me, Shape Me". After much success, Colbert and Graziano (without Loizzo who pursued a successful production career) created a new group, adding later day American Breed members Kevin Murphy (keyboards) and Paulette McWilliams (vocals), plus James Stella (vocals) and Vern Pilder (guitar) from the bar band Circus. They re-emerged in 1969 under the name Smoke. In 1970, after switching their management to Bob Monaco and Bill Traut, the group's name changed again to Ask Rufus, the name is taken from the title of the advice column in Mechanics Illustrated. At this point, Ciner came back to replace Pilder and Willie Weeks was added on bass after Colbert left.

In 1971, the band signed a contract with Epic Records recording an album that was not released, after which Epic dropped their contract in early 1972. Willie Weeks was in turn replaced by Dennis Belfield, James Stella by keyboardist/vocalist Ron Stockert and Lee Graziano by Andre Fischer. Paulette McWilliams and Chaka Khan had met and became the best of friends through their spouses Howard Towles and Hassan Khan. Khan attended most Ask Rufus gigs when they performed in Chicago. When Paulette decided she was leaving Ask Rufus, she told them she had the perfect singer to replace her; she had also asked Khan if she was interested. After the band hesitantly submitted, Paulette remained for a few weeks to teach Khan the material. Paulette also got Khan a gig with the group Lyfe, formed by Chicago's Cash McCall. Khan had been performing at the Pumpkin Room on the south side of Chicago, with a local group, Lock and Chain, led by drummer Scotty Harris.

Early career
Bob Monaco was part of a booking company known as Ashley Famous with Jim Golden. They booked Ask Rufus, with Paulette McWilliams and also the Rotary Connection with Minnie Riperton. Monaco was also responsible for helping get Ask Rufus their deal on ABC Dunhill. Monaco returned to Los Angeles, convinced the label to give him a demo budget and then quickly returned to Chicago where the group recorded eleven songs in two days at Marty Feldman's Paragon Studios. After taking the demo tapes back to ABC Dunhill in 1973, the group was immediately asked to sign a long-term recording contract.

A few weeks before Monaco saw Rufus perform, the group had already caught the attention of musician Ike Turner who flew them out to Los Angeles to record at his studio Bolic Sound in Inglewood, California. Turner wanted Khan to become an Ikette; she declined stating she was "really happy with Rufus. But Ike's attention was certainly a boost."

The group returned to Los Angeles shortly after to record Rufus at Quantum Recording Studios in Torrance, California, released in 1973. While the songs "Whoever's Thrilling You (Is Killing Me)" and "Feel Good" (both featuring Khan) brought the group some attention from R&B radio stations, the album itself had minimal sales, and the Stockert-led "Slip & Slide" failed to catch major attention from pop radio.

The group quickly re-entered the same studio to record their follow-up album Rags to Rufus. Ciner and Belfield left the group shortly thereafter along with Stockert, who was replaced by Los Angeles-based keyboardist Nate Morgan. Additionally, Tony Maiden and bassist Bobby Watson, also from Los Angeles, were recruited by drummer Andre Fischer. Maiden's, Watson's and Morgan's addition to Rufus added a unique sound to the group, bringing a stronger funk and jazz influence to complement Khan's now emerging powerful lead vocals.

Success, stardom and tension
Rags to Rufus was released in 1974 and two of its singles — the Stevie Wonder-penned "Tell Me Something Good" and the Parker-Khan composition, "You Got the Love" — became smash hits leading to Rags to Rufus going Platinum. They also landed opening spots for the tours of several top stars including Stevie Wonder, Cheech and Chong and the Hues Corporation. "Tell Me Something Good" also brought Rufus their first Grammy Award. In addition, it sold over one million copies, and was awarded a Gold disc by the RIAA on August 9, 1974. Due to Khan's increasing popularity Rufus and ABC started calling the group Rufus featuring Chaka Khan. With this new billing, the band recorded and quickly released their next album, Rufusized in 1974. Another Platinum success, the group entered the top ten again with the funk singles, "Once You Get Started", (penned by Gavin Christopher), "Stop on By", "I'm a Woman", and "Pack'd My Bags" (later sampled for Jody Watley's "Lovin' You So") and "Please Pardon Me (You Remind Me of a Friend)", penned by their friend Brenda Russell.

Heading into 1975, the group headlined their first major tour, with Khan attracting attention in concert reviews for her powerhouse vocals and sexy attire—so much so that Khan was often featured on magazine covers such as Jet. Also due to her off-stage antics that added to her on-stage persona, the media billed Khan as "the wild child". She was often compared to Tina Turner, with some rock and soul press labeling her a "pint-sized Tina". Attention to Khan began to make waves for some of the group's members, as they felt her presence overshadowed the band itself. The group's fourth release, and the third major release with Khan as singer, Rufus Featuring Chaka Khan, was released in 1975. The major hit off the album was a composition by Khan and Tony Maiden titled "Sweet Thing" which reached the top five of the charts and became their fourth record to reach Gold.

Despite the album's success as well as a second successful major tour that followed, tensions grew within the group, particularly between Khan and longtime Rufus drummer Andre Fischer. During recording sessions of Ask Rufus, Khan had married Richard Holland (she had divorced her first husband Hassan Khan in 1974 prior to the birth of their child Milini), and the presence of Holland only made things worse between Khan and Fischer. During one session of Ask Rufus, Fischer engaged in a fight with Holland, who received help from a counter-attacking Khan. Ask Rufus was released in 1977 and include the hits "At Midnight (My Love Will Lift You Up)", "Hollywood" and "Everlasting Love". Following a tour to promote Ask Rufus, Fischer finally left the group. He was followed by Nate Morgan. They were replaced by Richard "Moon" Calhoun and David "Hawk" Wolinski, respectively. The new line-up recorded the album, Street Player, which featured the Khan-composed song "Stay". After first putting it off as a rumor, Khan confirmed to media reports that she was going solo, signing a deal with Warner Bros. Records. The decision strained relations between Khan and the other Rufus members. Khan released her self-titled debut later in 1978. The album sold more than Street Player, going Platinum, thanks to the international Ashford & Simpson-composed single, "I'm Every Woman". Khan continued to promote the album in 1979. In April 1978, Calhoun was replaced by John "JR" Robinson as the group's drummer.

Decline and final years

Following Calhoun's replacement, another change came when ABC Records was absorbed by MCA, bringing the group to MCA. While Khan promoted Chaka, Rufus put out a less favorably received Khan-less album, Numbers. Khan returned to record with the band for the Quincy Jones-produced Masterjam. By now, Rufus and Khan were split in two, both acts being treated separately. Khan's stardom helped Masterjam go Gold thanks to the funk-laden disco recording, "Do You Love What You Feel".

Though Khan would later say that she was ready to leave Rufus at the time she released Chaka in 1978, she discovered that she had two more albums left in her ABC/MCA contract with the band and agreed to fulfill her obligations. Following Masterjam, one of the contractual albums, and another Khan-less album, Party 'Til You're Broke, which did not sell well, the factions of Rufus and Khan reunited for their last MCA album, Camouflage in 1981. Tension was felt during the album sessions. Khan avoided the band, recording her vocals alone to a click track.

The album failed to garner attention, mainly due to Khan's solo obligations, which now included two more Gold-certified studio albums, Naughty and What Cha' Gonna Do for Me. With the release of Camouflage, Khan was free to leave the group, and following her exit in early 1982, the remaining members of Rufus released what became their final studio album, Seal in Red in 1983 which, like their previous albums, went unnoticed.

Rufus band members agreed to split after one last live album. The band asked Khan to contribute to their final concert performance which would be filmed by Warner Bros., and she obliged, reuniting with the group for what was to be later released as a documentary film titled Stompin' At the Savoy. Warner Bros. declined to release the film at that time and released only the live album. The filmed concert has since been released to home-video. The album included four Khan-led studio songs, including the Dave Wolinski composition "Ain't Nobody", which got attention when a producer for the film Breakin' heard it while screening songs for the movie's soundtrack. Warner eventually released the song (with the billing Rufus and Chaka Khan) and the song became a top 30 Billboard Hot 100 hit, reaching number-one on the R&B chart and hitting number eight on the UK Singles Chart. The success of the track led to the band receiving its second Grammy Award for Best R&B Performance by a Duo or Group with Vocals.

Following this success, Rufus went their separate ways. Khan released the single "I Feel for You", cementing her success.

Post-break up
In 2001, Rufus (Kevin Murphy, Tony Maiden, Bobby Watson, Dave Wolinski, John "JR" Robinson) and Khan reunited for a brief tour, which Khan described in her 2003 autobiography, Chaka! Through the Fire (co-written with Tonya Bolden). Khan and Maiden reunited on the modernized Rufus medley, "Pack'd My Bags"/ "You Got the Love", on Khan's double Grammy Award-winning 2007 album, Funk This. When discussing another potential reunion with Rufus during a 2008 interview with Billboard, Khan said the band's classic lineup (which includes Andre Fischer and Nate Morgan) had no plans on reuniting, with Khan stating that touring with Tony Maiden, one of the few Rufus bandmates Khan kept a close friendship with, was the closest to another Rufus reunion. A lineup of Rufus including Bobby Watson and JR started a short tour in 2008. Neither founding member Kevin Murphy, mainstay Tony Maiden nor Dave Wolinski participated in this tour. In September 2011, the Rock & Roll Hall of Fame committee announced that the band and Khan were jointly nominated for induction to the 27th annual class. They had been eligible since 1999 (with the committee counting the band's first album as Rags to Rufus rather than 1973's Rufus). It was their first year of nomination. Earlier in the year, Khan received a solo star at the Hollywood Walk of Fame. Rufus was again nominated for the Rock & Roll Hall of Fame in September 2017.

Members
Former members
Lee Graziano – drums (1970–1972)
Chuck Colbert Jr. – bass (1970)
Al Ciner – guitar (1970–1974)
Paulette McWilliams – vocals (1970–1972)
James Stella – vocals (1970–1972)
Kevin Murphy – keyboards (1970–1983)
Willie Weeks – bass (1970–1972)
Chaka Khan – vocals (1972–1983)
Andre Fischer – drums (1972–1977)
Ron Stockert – keyboards, vocals (1972–1974)
Dennis Belfield – bass (1972–1974)
Tony Maiden – guitar, vocals (1974–1983)
Bobby Watson – bass (1974–1983)
Nate Morgan – keyboards (1974–1977, died 2013)
Richard "Moon" Calhoun – drums (1977–1979)
Dave "Hawk" Wolinski – keyboards, vocals (1977–1983)
John "JR" Robinson – drums (1979–1983)
Ivan Neville – vocals (1977–1983)

Timeline

Discography

Studio albums

Live albums

Compilation albums
The Very Best of Rufus featuring Chaka Khan (1982, MCA)
Chaka Khan and Rufus - Maybe Your Baby (2008, Cugate Ltd.)

Singles

Accolades

Grammy Awards
Rufus has won two Grammy Awards, from three Grammy nominations.

Covers
Rufus covered songs, including Quincy Jones' "Body Heat". "Ain't Nobody" would be covered by many artists, including Kelly Price, Faith Evans, Diana King and George Michael. 1983's "You're Really Out of Line" was recorded by Belgian band Awaken in 2001.

Notes

References

External links
[ Rufus] at AllMusic

American funk musical groups
American soul musical groups
Musical groups from Chicago
Musical groups established in 1972
Musical groups disestablished in 1983
Grammy Award winners
Epic Records artists
ABC Records artists
MCA Records artists
Warner Records artists